Valeriaaschero is a genus of beetles in the family Carabidae, containing the following species:

 Valeriaaschero flora Erwin, 2004
 Valeriaaschero nigrita Erwin, 2004

References

Lebiinae